This is a list of audio, video and film releases of The Secret Policeman's Ball series of charity shows.

Theatrical films made from the shows

UK film releases

US film releases

Australia/NZ film releases

TV specials made from the shows
The premiere broadcast of each TV special, listed in chronological sequence (This list excludes TV transmissions of films that had received prior theatrical release)

UK TV broadcasts

US TV broadcasts

Related TV shows (UK & US)
 Sky At Westminster Abbey (1981) – 75-minute concert celebrating Amnesty's 20th Anniversary 
 Conspiracy of Hope (1986) – All-day concert celebrating Amnesty International
 Human Rights Now! (1988) – Concert celebrating Amnesty International
 The Secret Policeman's Retro Ball! (1992) – 60-minute documentary on history of rock musician support for Amnesty
 The Secret Policeman's Concert (1992) -60-minute compilation of rock performances for Amnesty
 Free to Laugh: A Comedy and Music Special for Amnesty International  -TV special video-taped at the Wiltern Theater, Hollywood on Sunday March 8, 1992 
 Amnesty International Concert for Human Rights (1998) -Paris concert celebrating 50th Anniversary of Universal Declaration Of Human Rights
 Remember The Secret Policeman's Ball?  (2004)- 75-minute documentary about the Amnesty shows

DVD box set
The Secret Policeman's Balls is a three-disc DVD box set released by Shout! Factory in the United States and Canada on 27 January 2009. The discs record comedic and musical performances given at a series of fund-raising events for Amnesty International known collectively as The Secret Policeman's Balls, the performances are from events between 1976 and 1989.

The box set includes five films: Pleasure at Her Majesty's (1976), The Secret Policeman’s Ball (1979), The Secret Policeman's Other Ball (1981), The Secret Policeman’s Third Ball (1987) and The Secret Policeman’s Biggest Ball (1989). 

Performers featured include members of Monty Python, namely John Cleese, Graham Chapman, Terry Gilliam, Terry Jones and Michael Palin, performers from the early-1960s Satire Boom, such as Peter Cook, Dudley Moore, Alan Bennett and Jonathan Miller, as well then up-and-coming performers such as Rowan Atkinson, Stephen Fry, Hugh Laurie, and Jennifer Saunders.

The box set also contains performances by musicians, Pete Townshend, Sting, Phil Collins, Bob Geldof, Peter Gabriel, Jackson Browne, Lou Reed, Kate Bush and Joan Armatrading, plus duets from Eric Clapton and Jeff Beck, and Mark Knopfler and Chet Atkins.

Also included is a BBC documentary Remember The Secret Policeman’s Ball, and some performances from The Mermaid Frolics (1977) and introductions and commentaries from executive producer Martin Lewis, who also provided the sleeve notes.

Audio recordings made from the shows

UK – Audio releases

US/Canada – Audio releases

CD Booklet notes
 The Complete A Poke In The Eye – CD release Springtime!/Castle 1992
 The Complete Secret Policeman's Other Ball – CD release Springtime!/Castle 1992
 The Secret Policeman's Concert – CD release Springtime!/Castle 1992
 The Secret Policeman's Other Ball – The Music – CD release Springtime!/Rhino 1992
 Dead Parrot Society – CD release Springtime!/Rhino 1993

References

Benefit concerts
Amnesty International
Television videos and DVDs